Ode to Newfoundland is the official provincial anthem of Newfoundland and Labrador, Canada.  

Originally composed by Governor Sir Cavendish Boyle in 1902 as a four-verse poem titled Newfoundland; it was sung by Frances Daisy Foster at the Casino Theatre of St. John's during the closing of the play Mamzelle on December 22, 1902. The original score was set to the music of E. R. Krippner, a German bandmaster living in St. John's but Boyle desired a more dignified score. It was then set to the music of British composer Sir Hubert Parry, a personal friend of Boyle, who composed two settings. 

On May 20th, 1904, the Ode was chosen as Newfoundland's official national anthem. This distinction was dropped when Newfoundland joined Canada in 1949.  Three decades later, in 1980, the province re-adopted the song as an official provincial anthem, the first province to do so. The Ode is still sung at public events to this day as a tradition. Typically, only the first and last verses are sung.

Lyrics

See also

 Anthems and nationalistic songs of Canada
 List of Newfoundland songs
Ode to Labrador

References

External links
 Midi sound file

1902 songs
Regional songs
Newfoundland and Labrador music
Canadian anthems
Historical national anthems
Provincial symbols of Newfoundland and Labrador
Compositions by Hubert Parry